Season twenty of Dancing with the Stars premiered on March 16, 2015, and concluded on May 19, 2015.

This season marked the tenth anniversary of the show. In honor of this anniversary, winners Rumer Willis and Valentin Chmerkovskiy received a special 10th Anniversary golden Mirrorball Trophy. R5 singer Riker Lynch and Allison Holker finished in second place, while former soldier Noah Galloway and Sharna Burgess finished in third.

Cast

Couples
Ten professional partners were revealed on February 11, 2015, on Good Morning America. Joining Lindsay Arnold, Sasha Farber, Henry Byalikov and Jenna Johnson in the troupe this season were Brittany Cherry and Alan Bersten (from the tenth season of So You Think You Can Dance). Eleven of the celebrity competitors and their professional partners were revealed on Good Morning America on February 24, 2015. Witney Carson's celebrity partner was reported to be Chris Soules from The Bachelor on March 4, 2015; Soules later confirmed to be on the show on March 10, nearly 12 hours after that show's finale. At the age of 14, Willow Shields was at this point the youngest contestant ever to compete on the show

Host and judges
Tom Bergeron returned as host alongside Erin Andrews. Len Goodman, Carrie Ann Inaba, Julianne Hough, and Bruno Tonioli returned as judges.

Scoring charts

Notes

 : This was the lowest score of the week.
 : This was the highest score of the week.
 :  This couple finished in first place.
 :  This couple finished in second place.
 :  This couple finished in third place.
 :  This couple was eliminated.

Highest and lowest scoring performances
The best and worst performances in each dance according to the judges' 40-point scale are as follows:

Couples' highest and lowest scoring dances
Scores are based upon a potential 40-point maximum.

Weekly scores
Individual judges' scores in the charts below (given in parentheses) are listed in this order from left to right: Carrie Ann Inaba, Len Goodman, Julianne Hough, Bruno Tonioli.

Week 1: Premiere Night
Couples performed the cha-cha-cha, foxtrot or jive. Couples are listed in the order they performed.

Week 2: My Jam Monday
Couples performed one unlearned dance to one of their favorite songs. The Argentine tango, rumba, salsa, and samba were introduced. Couples are listed in the order they performed.

Week 3: Latin Night
Couples performed one unlearned Latin-themed dance. The paso doble was introduced. Couples are listed in the order they performed.

Week 4: Most Memorable Year Night
Couples performed one unlearned dance to celebrate the most memorable years of their lives. Contemporary, jazz, tango, and waltz were introduced. Couples are listed in the order they performed.

Week 5: Disney Night
Couples performed one unlearned dance to a song from a Disney film. The quickstep was introduced. Couples are listed in the order they performed.

Week 6: Spring Break Night
Couples performed one unlearned dance and a team dance. The Viennese waltz was introduced. Couples are listed in the order they performed.

Week 7: Eras Night
Couples performed one unlearned dance representing a different historical era. The couple with the highest score earned immunity from elimination, while the rest of the couples participated in dance-offs for extra points. For each dance-off, the couple with the highest score picked the opponent against whom they wanted to dance; the chosen opponent was allowed to pick the dance style (from cha-cha-cha, foxtrot, or salsa). The winner of each dance-off earned two points. For winning immunity, Nastia & Sasha received a three-point bonus. The Charleston was introduced. Couples are listed in the order they performed.

Week 8: America's Choice Night
Couples performed a routine featuring an unlearned dance and song that was chosen by the public, as well as a trio dance involving an eliminated pro or a member of the dance troupe. Couples are listed in the order they performed. Two couples were eliminated at the end of the night.

Week 9: Semifinals
Couples performed one unlearned dance, and as a routine coached and styled by one of the four judges. To avoid favoritism, the judges did not score the couple they coached, so the second round dances received a total score out of 30 instead of 40. Couples are listed in the order they performed.

Week 10: Finals
On the first night, couples performed a dance they previously performed, as well as a freestyle routine. On the second night, the couples danced a fusion dance of two previously learned dance styles. Couples are listed in the order they performed. 

Night 1

Night 2

Dance chart
The celebrities and professional partners danced one of these routines for each corresponding week:
 Week 1 (Premiere Night): One unlearned dance 
 Week 2 (My Jam Monday): One unlearned dance
 Week 3 (Latin Night): One unlearned dance
 Week 4 (Most Memorable Year Night): One unlearned dance
 Week 5 (Disney Night): One unlearned dance
 Week 6 (Spring Break Night): One unlearned dance & team dances
 Week 7 (Eras Night): One unlearned dance & dance-offs
 Week 8 (America's Choice Night): One unlearned dance & trio dance
 Week 9 (Semifinals): One unlearned dance & judge's choice
 Week 10 (Finals, Night 1): Repeated dance & freestyle
 Week 10 (Finals, Night 2): Fusion dance

Notes

 :  This was the highest scoring dance of the week.
 :  This was the lowest scoring dance of the week.
 :  This couple gained bonus points for winning this dance-off.
 :  This couple gained no bonus points for losing this dance-off.
 :  This couple earned immunity and did not have to compete in the dance-off.
 :  This couple danced, but received no scores.

Ratings

References

External links

Dancing with the Stars (American TV series)
2015 American television seasons